Zarghun Ghar (lit. "Green Mountain"), or Zarghoon Mountains, is a mountain range located in the east of the Quetta District, in Balochistan Province, western Pakistan. It contains the tallest mountain in the Balochistan region. The range is home to a broad swathe of flora and fauna.

Peaks
The Zarghun Ghar range's highest peak is Loy saar Naikan, at 3,578 meters (11738. ft) which is also consider as the highest mountain peak in Balochistan Province, while the second highest peak is Kuchnai Saar, at 3,404 meters (11,170. ft). At , The "Loy Saar Naikan" of the Zarghun Ghar mountain range is the highest mount peak of Baluchistan.

Flora
The base of the Zarghoon Ghar up to Ziarat is densely covered by Pashtun juniper (Juniperus seravschanica) trees, a forest of about 200,000 acres (810 km2). The Pashtun Juniper forest in the adjacent Ziarat District covers an area of about 247,000 acres (1,000 km2).

See also 
 Sulaiman Mountains
 List of mountains in Pakistan
 Mountain ranges of Pakistan

References

External links
 Mount Chiltan at Wikimapia.com
 Ncbi.nlm.nih.gov

Mountain ranges of Balochistan (Pakistan)
Quetta District
Sulaiman Mountains